Sir Andrew Douglas of Hermiston (d. bef. 1277) was a medieval Scottish nobleman.

Life
Although it cannot be proven except circumstantially, Douglas appears to be the son of Archibald, Lord of Douglas (c.1198-1238) by his wife Margaret Crawford. There is charter evidence of the Lord of Douglas receiving the lands of Hermiston from Máel Coluim II, Earl of Fife

Sir Andrew is the ancestor of the Earls of Morton, and the family of Douglas of Mains.

See also
Scottish people

References

Notes

Sources
Balfour Paul, Sir James. The Scots Peerage IX Vols. Edinburgh 1904. 
Registrum honoris de Morton; a series of ancient charters of the earldom of Morton, with other original papers, ed.Thomson, McDonald, Innes. Bannatyne, Edinburgh 1853. 

Scottish knights
Andrew
People from East Lothian
Year of birth uncertain
Year of death uncertain
13th-century deaths